Varalee "Sandy" Sureephong (born May 2, 1976) is an American former professional tennis player.

Biography
Born in Charleston, West Virginia, Sureephong is of Thai descent and was raised in Baltimore, then later Haines City, Florida. She has been known by "Sandy" since childhood, a nickname which her parents gave her.

Sureephong was a four-time All-American tennis player at the University of Texas, which she attended from 1995 to 1999. She was twice named the Big 12 Conference Player of the Year.

On the professional tour she reached a best singles ranking of 368 and was ranked as high as 158 in the world for doubles. She competed in four WTA Tour main draws in doubles and was most successful in partnership with Canada's Vanessa Webb, with whom she won four of her six ITF doubles titles. The pair featured in the qualifying draw for the 1994 Wimbledon Championships.

Her husband is former Chicago Bulls basketball player Ricky Blanton.

ITF finals

Singles: 1 (0–1)

Doubles: 14 (6–8)

References

External links
 
 

1976 births
Living people
American female tennis players
Tennis people from Florida
Texas Longhorns women's tennis players
American sportspeople of Thai descent
People from Haines City, Florida
Sportspeople from Charleston, West Virginia